The 2019 Georgia State Panthers baseball team represents Georgia State University in the 2019 NCAA Division I baseball season. The Panthers play their home games at the GSU Baseball Complex.

Personnel

Roster

Coaching staff

Schedule

! style="" | Regular Season
|- valign="top" 

|- bgcolor="#ffcccc"
| 1 || February 15 ||  || GSU Baseball Complex || L 6–13 || 0–1 || –
|- bgcolor="#ffcccc"
| 2 || February 16 || West Virginia || GSU Baseball Complex || L 2–8 || 0–2 || –
|- bgcolor="#ccffcc"
| 3 || February 16 || Illinois-Chicago || GSU Baseball Complex || W 9–5 || 1–2 || –
|- bgcolor="#ffcccc"
| 4 || February 22 || Charleston Southern || Charleston, SC || L 2–5 || 1–3 || –
|- bgcolor="#ccffcc"
| 5 || February 23 || Charleston Southern || Charleston, SC || W 15–6 || 2–3 || –
|- bgcolor="#ccffcc"
| 6 || February 23 || Charleston Southern || Charleston, SC || W 7–6 || 3–3 || –
|- bgcolor="#ffcccc"
| 7 || February 26 || Georgia Tech || Atlanta, GA || L 3–7 || 3–4 || –
|- bgcolor="#ffcccc"
| 8 || February 27 || Georgia Tech || GSU Baseball Complex || L 0–10 || 3–5 || –
|-

|- bgcolor="#ffcccc"
| 9 || March 1 ||  Samford || GSU Baseball Complex || L 2–13 || 3–6 || –
|- bgcolor="#ffcccc"
| 10 || March 2 || Samford || GSU Baseball Complex || L 6–8 || 3–7 || –
|- bgcolor="#ffcccc"
| 11 || March 2 || Samford || GSU Baseball Complex || L 1–2 || 3–8 || –
|- bgcolor="#ffcccc"
| 12 || March 5 || Mercer  || Macon, GA || L 11–14 || 3–9 || –
|- bgcolor="#ccffcc"
| 12 || March 8 || ETSU || GSU Baseball Complex || W 6–5 || 4–9 || –
|- bgcolor="#ffcccc"
| 13 || March 9 || ETSU || GSU Baseball Complex || L 2–8 || 4–10 || –
|- bgcolor="#ffcccc"
| 14 || March 9 || Samford || GSU Baseball Complex || L 1–5 || 4–11 || –
|- bgcolor="#ccffcc"
| 15 || March 12 || Georgia Southwestern || GSU Baseball Complex || W 9-5 || 5–11 || –
|- bgcolor="#ffcccc"
| 16 || March 13 || Georgia || GSU Baseball Complex || L 3-6 || 5–12 || –
|- bgcolor="#ccffcc"
| 17 || March 15 || Appalachian State || Boone, NC || W 2-0 || 6–12 || 1–0
|- bgcolor="#ffcccc"
| 18 || March 16 || Appalachian State || Boone, NC || L 3-9 || 6–13 || 1–1
|- bgcolor="#ccffcc"
| 19 || March 17 || Appalachian State || Boone, NC || W 17-6 || 7–13 || 2–1
|- bgcolor="#ffcccc"
| 20 || March 19 || Georgia || Athens, GA || L 1–11 || 7–14 || –
|- bgcolor="#ffcccc"
| 21 || March 22 || UT Arlington || GSU Baseball Complex || L 6–14 || 7–15 || 2–2
|- bgcolor="#ffcccc"
| 22 || March 23 || UT Arlington || GSU Baseball Complex || L 3–4 || 7–16 || 2–3
|- bgcolor="#ffcccc"
| 23 || March 24 || UT Arlington || GSU Baseball Complex || L 2–4 || 7–17 || 2–4
|- bgcolor="#ccffcc"
| 24 || March 27 || Kennesaw State || GSU Baseball Complex || W 9–7 || 8–17 || –
|- bgcolor="#ffcccc"
| 25 || March 29 || Little Rock || Little Rock, AR || L 1–9 || 8–18 || 2–5
|- bgcolor="#ffcccc"
| 26 || March 30 || Little Rock || Little Rock, AR || L 2–6 || 8–19 || 2–6
|- bgcolor="#ffcccc"
| 27 || March 31 || Little Rock || Little Rock, AR || L 2–3 || 8–20 || 2–7
|-

|- bgcolor="#ccffcc"
| 28 || April 3 || Furman || GSU Baseball Complex || W 10–8 || 9–20 || –
|- bgcolor="#ffcccc"
| 29 || April 5 || ULM || GSU Baseball Complex || L 8-16 || 9–21 || 2–8
|- bgcolor="#ffcccc"
| 30 || April 6 || ULM || GSU Baseball Complex || L 3–10 || 9–22 || 2–9
|- bgcolor="#ffcccc"
| 31 || April 7 || ULM || GSU Baseball Complex || L 3–9 || 9–23 || 2–10
|- bgcolor="#ccffcc"
| 32 || April 10 || Mercer || GSU Baseball Complex || W 4–2 || 10–23 || –
|- bgcolor="#ffcccc"
| 33 || April 12 || Troy || GSU Baseball Complex || L 6–10 || 10–24 || 2–11
|- bgcolor="#ccffcc"
| 34 || April 13 || Troy || GSU Baseball Complex || W 12–5 || 11–24 || 3–11
|- bgcolor="#ffcccc"
| 35 || April 13 || Troy || GSU Baseball Complex || L 5–10 || 11–25 || 3–12
|- bgcolor="#ccffcc"
| 36 || April 16 || Savannah State || GSU Baseball Complex || W 5–1 || 12–25 || –
|- bgcolor="#ffcccc"
| 37 || April 19 || South Alabama || Mobile, AL || L 7–9 || 12–26 || 3–13
|- bgcolor="#ffcccc"
| 38 || April 19 || South Alabama || Mobile, AL || L 2–4 || 12–27 || 3–14
|- bgcolor="#ffcccc"
| 39 || April 20 || South Alabama || Mobile, AL || L 7–10 || 12–28 || 3–15
|- bgcolor="#ffcccc"
| 40 || April 22 || Kennesaw State || Kennesaw, GA || L 10–12 || 12–29 || -
|- bgcolor="#ffcccc"
| 41 || April 24 || Furman || Greenville, SC || L 3–4 (11 inn) || 12–30 || –
|- bgcolor="#ffcccc"
| 42 || April 26 || Coastal Carolina || GSU Baseball Complex || L 2–27 || 12–31 || 3–16
|- bgcolor="#ffcccc"
| 43 || April 27 || Coastal Carolina || GSU Baseball Complex || L 5–6 (10 inn) || 12–32 || 3–17
|- bgcolor="#ccffcc"
| 44 || April 28 || Coastal Carolina || GSU Baseball Complex || W 15–11 || 13–32 || 4–17
|-

|- bgcolor="#ffcccc"
| 45 || May 4 || Texas State || San Marcos, TX || L 1–5 || 13–33 || 4–18
|- bgcolor="#ccffcc"
| 46 || May 4 || Texas State || San Marcos, TX || W 3–1 || 14–33 || 5–18
|- bgcolor="#ffcccc"
| 47 || May 5 || Texas State || San Marcos, TX || L 2–12 || 14–34 || 5–19
|- bgcolor="#ffcccc"
| 48 || May 8 || Presbyterian || GSU Baseball Complex || L 4–13 || 14–35 || –
|- bgcolor="#ffcccc"
| 49 || May 10 || Louisiana || Lafayette, LA || L 0–2 || 14–36 || 5–20
|- bgcolor="#ffcccc"
| 50 || May 11 || Louisiana || Lafayette, LA || L 6–16 || 14–37 || 5–21
|- bgcolor="#ffcccc"
| 51 || May 12 || Louisiana || Lafayette, LA || L 5–11 || 14–38 || 5–22
|- bgcolor="#ffcccc"
| 52 || May 14 || Presbyterian || Clinton, SC || L 7–11 || 14–39 || –
|- bgcolor="#ffcccc"
| 53 || May 16 ||  Georgia Southern  || GSU Baseball Complex || L 3–4 || 14–40 || 5–23
|- bgcolor="#ffcccc"
| 54 || May 17 ||  Georgia Southern || GSU Baseball Complex || L 2–7 || 14–41 || 5–24
|- bgcolor="#ccffcc"
| 55 || May 18 ||  Georgia Southern || GSU Baseball Complex || W 15–7 || 15–41 || 6–24
|-

References

Georgia State
Georgia State Panthers baseball seasons
Georgia State baseball